Meyers Place, California may refer to:
Meyers Place, Glenn County, California
Meyers Place, Tehama County, California